Tel Aviv attack may refer to:

1948 Tel Aviv bus station bombing
1972 Lod Airport massacre, near Tel Aviv
1975 Savoy Hotel attack
1989 Tel Aviv–Jerusalem bus 405 suicide attack
1989 Purim stabbing attack, Tel Aviv
1996 Dizengoff Center suicide bombing
1997 Café Apropo bombing
2002 Allenby Street bus bombing
2002 Neve Shaanan Street bombing
2002 Rishon LeZion bombing, near Tel Aviv
2002 Tel Aviv outdoor mall bombing
2003 Tel Aviv Central bus station massacre
2003 Mike's Place suicide bombing
2004 Carmel Market bombing
2005 Stage Club bombing
2006 Tel Aviv shawarma restaurant bombing
2009 Tel Aviv gay centre shooting
2011 Tel Aviv nightclub attack
2012 Tel Aviv bus bombing
2013: 2013 Bat Yam bus bombing, near Tel Aviv
2014 Killing of Sergeant Almog Shiloni
2015 Tel Aviv synagogue stabbing
January 2016 Tel Aviv shooting
March 2016 Tel Aviv stabbings
June 2016 Tel Aviv shooting
2019 Tel Aviv rocket strike
2022 Bnei Brak shootings
2022 Tel Aviv shooting